Carlo Santuccione (23 October 1947 in Cepagatti – 4 March 2017 in Pescara) was an Italian sports doctor who was also known as Ali the Chemist. Santuccione worked with Francesco Conconi at the University of Ferrara in Italy at the Centro Studi Biomedici Applicati allo Sport or Biomedical Research Institute.

History
During the 1990s, Santuccione worked with Conconi the man that is said to have introduced Erythropoietin or EPO to the sport of cycling. 

Santuccione was suspended from acting as a physician from 1995-2000 by the Italian National Olympic Committee. Santuccione's name appeared in the case against Francesco Conconi; and he was subject to additional investigation in 2001. In 2004, the large scale operation Oil for Drugs began in 29 Italian provinces against a doping network that Santuccione was suspected to have headed. Doping products such as Testosterone anabolic steroids, EPO, Aranesp (Darbepoetin alfa) and blood transfusion equipment (Blood doping) were found and investigations were opened against 138 athletes (15 of whom were professional cyclists). On 18 December 2007 Santuccione was given a lifetime ban by the Italian National Olympic Committee due to his involvement in the Oil for Drugs case and after having already serving a lengthy ban for a previous doping offense.
Riccardo Riccò who finished second in the 2008 Giro d'Italia and tested positive for a form of third generation EPO during the 2008 Tour de France named Santuccione as his supplier of the drug.

List of racers 
Alessio Galletti
Mario Scirea
Fabio Sacchi
Eddy Mazzoleni
Danilo Di Luca
Alessandro Spezialetti
Ruggero Marzoli
Giuseppe Muraglia
Simone Masciarelli
Riccardo Riccò

References

1947 births
Living people
People from the Province of Pescara
Italian sports physicians
Italian cycling coaches
Drugs in sport in Italy